The World Group was the highest level of Davis Cup competition in 1989. The first-round losers went into the Davis Cup World Group Qualifying Round, and the winners progressed to the quarterfinals and were guaranteed a World Group spot for 1990.

West Germany won the title for a second consecutive year, defeating Sweden in the final, 3–2. The final was held at the Schleyer-Halle in Stuttgart, West Germany, on 15–17 December. It was the West Germany team's 2nd Davis Cup title overall.

Participating teams

Draw

First round

Sweden vs. Italy

Austria vs. Australia

Yugoslavia vs. Denmark

Spain vs. Mexico

United States vs. Paraguay

Israel vs. France

Czechoslovakia vs. Soviet Union

West Germany vs. Indonesia

Quarterfinals

Austria vs. Sweden

Yugoslavia vs. Spain

United States vs. France

Czechoslovakia vs. West Germany

Semifinals

Sweden vs. Yugoslavia

West Germany vs. United States

Final

West Germany vs. Sweden

References

External links
Davis Cup official website

World Group
Davis Cup World Group
Davis Cup
German